ANSI A300 is the tree care industry standard of care in the USA. It was developed by Tree Care Industry Association and maintained by consensus of various industry stakeholders through periodically reviewing and updating the guidelines. The standard is divided into ten parts:

Part 1 - Pruning
Part 2 – Soil Management
Part 3 – Supplemental Support Systems
Part 4 – Lightning Protection Systems
Part 5 – Management of Trees on Construction Sites
Part 6 – Planting and Transplanting
Part 7 – Integrated Vegetation Management
Part 8 - Root Management Standard
Part 9 – Tree Risk Assessment
Part 10- Integrated Pest Management

A proposed A300 Part 11, Urban Forest Products, was not adopted because it was deemed to be outside the scope of tree care management standards.

References

Trees
Forestry
American National Standards Institute standards